Willem Johan Herman Mulier, known as Pim Mulier (10 March 1865 – 12 April 1954) was one of the leading figures in sporting history of the Netherlands.

 He was founder of sports club Koninklijke HFC in 1879 and the first tennis club in the Netherlands in 1884. He also organized the first athletics competition and introduced cricket and hockey to the Netherlands.

In 1889 he was founder of the Nederlandsche Voetbal- en Athletische Bond, the Dutch Football and Athletics Association. In 1890 he ice skated past eleven cities in Friesland, which became a precursor to the Elfstedentocht. He designed the medal for participation himself.

In 1891, Mulier, with the assistance of Charles Goodman Tebbutt, introduced bandy to the Netherlands.

References

External links 
Pim Mulier at www.speedskatingnews.info
International Skating Union – Past Presidents at www.isu.org

1865 births
1954 deaths
Founders of association football institutions
Dutch male speed skaters
People from Wûnseradiel
Sportspeople from Haarlem
International Skating Union presidents
Bandy in the Netherlands
Presidents of the Royal Dutch Football Association